Shore Tilbe Perkins+Will, formerly Shore Tilbe Irwin & Partners (STIP), is a Canadian architecture firm based in Toronto, Ontario. Since its founding as Shore and Moffat in 1945, and later as Shore Tilbe Irwin & Partners, the firm has completed numerous buildings, complexes and master plans across Canada, as well as at locations in the United States and Bermuda. From early educational and residential projects, the firm rose to prominence in the early 1950s, winning Governor General's Medals in Architecture and commissions from the government of Ontario for departmental buildings, and it went on to design prominent landmarks such as Purdy's Wharf in Halifax, Nova Scotia, and the redesign of Nathan Phillips Square in Toronto. The firm's scope today mostly encompasses community centres, libraries, pharmaceutical laboratories, offices and university teaching buildings, although the firm has also completed religious spaces, corporate interiors and public plazas.

History

Founded as Shore and Moffat by Leonard Shore and Bob Moffat in 1945, the first project completed was the Meaford Public School in Meaford, Ontario. After the completion of some small-scale residential and commercial projects, the two partners received their first large commission in 1947 from the Ontario Food Terminal Board in Toronto.

By the early 1950s, the firm had expanded to take on 10 employees, including Alfred Tilbe.  Schools and other educational buildings supplied most of the work, and the firm completed Brock High School, Goderich Collegiate, Stayner Collegiate and Collingwood Collegiate.  Shore and Moffat designed the York Township Municipal Offices in 1952, which won them the Massey Medal. They also submitted a proposal for the Toronto City Hall international competition, which was ultimately unsuccessful.  The later part of the decade brought three significant projects: the William Lyon Mackenzie Building, which was to be the second-largest building in Toronto at the time, the Union Carbide Head Office, and the Imperial Oil Research Centre.  The latter building won Shore and Moffat another Massey Medal and launched the firm into the research field, bringing them projects for Petro Canada, Royal Dutch Shell and Teck Cominco.  By 1959, the firm had expanded to 40 staff, and was now providing engineering services as well.

In terms of design credentials, the Union Carbide Building was a significant project for the firm. Built near the intersection of Yonge Street and Eglinton Avenue, it was one of the first corporate headquarters built north of the downtown core.  Said of it: "While one may not agree on its historicity, one can't dismiss the fact that the Union Carbide building is unique, both structurally and aesthetically. It was engineered in such a way that its weight is supported entirely by its outside columns; uncluttered by posts, these airy interiors could be easily adapted to different needs. The builders chose to give the building an interesting mix of materials; granite, nickel and stainless steel creating a countenance full of dignity and character. Equally significant was that Union Carbide was one of north Toronto's first major corporate headquarters."  It was demolished in July 1999, an act lamented by the Toronto Star architecture critic, Christopher Hume.

In 1960, Bob Moffat died, and the firm of 150 was renamed Shore and Moffat and Partners.  Projects included the master plans for the University of Waterloo and the York University campuses, as well as the National Research Science Library and the Alexander Campbell Building in Ottawa.  Schools remained a staple source of income, however, into the 1970s demand for their construction was declining, and thus Shore and Moffat turned its focus elsewhere.  The partners at the time, Len Shore, Art Henschel and Alf Tilbe, hired Stephen Irwin, appointed him partner, and changed the firm name to Shore Tilbe Henschel Irwin Architects and Engineers.  Irwin's designs at this time included 52 Division Police Station in Toronto, the Xerox Research Centre, and the Kortright Centre. Within a few years the firm changed the company name to Shore Tilbe Henschel Irwin and Peters when Dennis Peters was brought aboard as a partner.

With the award-winning design of the North York YMCA by Terry Fitsialos in 1979, Shore Tilbe Henschel Irwin and Peters' long relationship with the YMCA began. Fitsialos, an associate at the time, became a partner in 1986. Other buildings designed by the firm during this time were H.J.A. Brown Education Centre, Peel Regional Police Headquarters, and the post-modern Metropolitan Toronto Police Headquarters.

Leonard Shore died in 1989, and as he had no immediate family, the Shore Foundation was created in his memory to assist the University of Toronto, and the L.E. Shore Memorial Library in Thornbury, Ontario. In early 1990, partners Arthur Herschel and Dennis Peters retired, and Brian Aitken and David Mitchell were made partners. The firm's name changed once again to Shore Tilbe Irwin & Partners. The scope of work expanded again to include extended care, academic facilities, pharmaceutical laboratories and recreational architecture.  During this time, the L.E Shore Library was completed, as well as the Mississauga Public Library. In 1999, Alfred Tilbe died.

Even though STIP continued to win awards, the firm was seen as coasting on its reputation, failing to provide forward-looking design and planning, and faced the danger of becoming simply a drawing production office.

The new millennium brought about dramatic changes within the STIP's structure and direction, which was spearheaded by D'Arcy Arthurs.  In 2000, the firm saw the expansion of Shore Tilbe Irwin & Partner's in-house interior design department and then in 2002 the addition of Andrew Frontini to the firm's team. Frontini became partner in 2005. Under Frontini's direction, the Whitby Public Library and Civic Square was completed and featured in, and on, the cover of Canadian Architect magazine. This project was hailed as marking Shore Tilbe's turning point.  Frontini also designed the Hazel McCallion Academic Learning Centre at the University of Toronto Mississauga Campus. Duff Balmer, the designer of the Angus Glen Community Centre in Markham, Ontario, was also an integral part of the renaissance at STIP. Balmer is credited as the lead designer on the Health and Wellness Centre at the UofT Mississauga Campus; the former winning the National Post/Design Exchange Silver Award in 2005.

In joint venture with Kohn Shnier Architects (KSa), STIP completed the award-winning renovations to the E.J. Pratt Library at Victoria University on the UofT St. George Campus. John Potter, who led the KSa team on the Pratt Library project, went on to join STIP in 2006. Another notable project was the Canadian National Institute for the Blind Headquarters in Toronto, done in joint venture with Sterling Finlayson Architects (currently Sweeny Sterling Finlayson &Co Architects Inc. as a result of a 2005 merger).

Environmental sustainability has become more and more prevalent in STIP's designs, demonstrated in the greenhouse gas reduction technology used in the Fathom Five National Marine Park/Bruce Peninsula National Park visitors' centre, The Wellness Centre at the UofT Mississauga Campus (UTM) also incorporated green roofs, one of which was intended for use by the biology department. The Hazel McCallion Academic Learning Center at the UTM was the first project at the University of Toronto to achieve LEED Certification. STIP is currently working on a number of projects aiming for LEED Gold Certification including the London Community Recreation Centre & Library and the East Markham Community Centre & Library.

On March 8, 2007, it was announced at Toronto City Hall that STIP, along with PLANT Architect, had been awarded the $40 million redesign of the iconic Nathan Phillips Square.

In February 2010, Shore Tilbe Irwin & Partners merged with Chicago-based Perkins+Will to form Shore Tilbe Perkins+Will. In May 2011, the firm merged with Ottawa-based Vermeulen Hind Architects and, together with Vancouver-based Busby Perkins+Will, the three rebranded to form Perkins+Will Canada, a unified national practice.

Partners, associates, and key staff

Partners
 Stephen Irwin
 D'Arcy Arthurs
 Duff Balmer
 Brian Aitken
 Stephen Ploeger
 David Mitchell

Associates
 Phil Fenech
 Jan-Willem Gritters
 Alan Mortsch
 Frank Park
 Linda Neumayer
 Werner Sommer

Interior design
 Liz Livingston
 Diana Shams

Projects
A gallery of some of STIP's recent projects:

Brief list of some of STIP's other projects:

Awards

Footnotes

External links
 

Architecture firms of Canada